The 1970–71 season was the 91st season of competitive football in England.

Honours

Notes = Number in parentheses is the times that club has won that honour. * indicates new record for competition

FA Cup 

The 1971 FA Cup Final saw Arsenal beat Liverpool 2–1 to become only the fourth club in history and the second club this century to have won the league championship and FA Cup double.

Stoke City beat Everton 3–2 at Selhurst Park in a third-place playoff, held the day before the final. The biggest FA Cup shock, however, was Fourth Division Colchester United's 3–2 victory over Don Revie's Leeds United at Layer Road in the fifth round.

Barnet equalled the record for the biggest win by a non-league team over a Football League team by beating Newport County 6–1 in the First Round.

League Cup 

The final was held at Wembley Stadium, London. Tottenham Hotspur beat Aston Villa to win the 1971 Football League Cup Final and add to their list of trophies won under the management of Bill Nicholson.

Football League

First Division
Arsenal won the league championship at the end of a season which would soon be followed by their FA Cup final tie with Liverpool. Arsenal secured the league title at White Hart Lane, the home of bitter rivals Tottenham. They narrowly overcame Leeds to win the league, with a 12-point gap separating Leeds from third-placed Tottenham. Wolves and Liverpool joined these two teams in the UEFA Cup. Chelsea missed out on the top five on goal average but compensated for this shortcoming by achieving European Cup Winners' Cup glory over Real Madrid.

Burnley and Blackpool (who won this year's Anglo-Italian Cup) were relegated to the Second Division. Burnley returned from 1973–74 to 1975–76 but Blackpool had to wait 39 years to regain their top flight status for the 2010–11 season.

Wilf McGuinness was sacked at the end of 1970 after 18 unsuccessful months as manager of Manchester United. Sir Matt Busby was re-appointed as manager on a temporary basis, but never considered returning to his old job on a permanent basis. Leicester City manager Frank O'Farrell was appointed at the end of the season, ahead of more reputable candidates including Jock Stein and Don Revie.

Second Division
Leicester City and Sheffield United were promoted to the First Division. Blackburn Rovers and Bolton Wanderers, two of the most famous and historic names in English football, were relegated to the Third Division.

Third Division
Preston North End and Fulham finally had something to shout about by getting promoted to the Second Division. Reading, Bury, Doncaster Rovers and Gillingham slid into the Fourth Division.

Fourth Division
Notts County, Bournemouth & Boscombe Athletic, Oldham Athletic and York City were promoted to the Third Division. Newport County set a new Football League record by not winning any of their first 25 matches. The Football League voted for the league's four bottom clubs to maintain their status.

Top goalscorers

First Division
Tony Brown (West Bromwich Albion) – 28 goals

Second Division
John Hickton (Middlesbrough) – 25 goals

Third Division
Gerry Ingram (Preston North End) and Dudley Roberts (Mansfield Town) – 22 goals

Fourth Division
Ted MacDougall (Bournemouth & Boscombe Athletic) – 42 goals

European football

Leeds United won the Inter-Cities Fairs Cup against Juventus in the two leg Final and also took part in the Inter-Cities Fairs Cup Trophy Play-Off which they lost 2–1 to Barcelona.

There was also success in London for Chelsea, who beat Real Madrid in the European Cup Winners Cup final to win their first ever European trophy.

Deaths

 5 June 1971 – Kevin Baron, 44, former Liverpool forward who collected a runners-up medal in the 1950 FA Cup Final.

Ford Sporting League 
The Ford Sporting League was a short-lived reward scheme sponsored by the Ford Motor Company. Its only season was that of 1970–71.  Clubs were awarded a point for every goal scored at home and two points for every goal scored away, but lost 5 points if a player was booked and 10 points if a player was sent off.

Points could be earned over the first 42 league games (it did not apply to cup ties) only, so that the First and Second divisions were on an equal footing with the Third and Fourth.

Oldham Athletic won the competition, winning a pot of £70,000.  League rules stipulated the prize money be used on stadium improvements, so the money went to build a stand in the stadium.

The £70,000 prize fund was made up of 8 monthly prizes of £2,500 and then a final prize of £50,000. The points total was cumulative, which resulted in Oldham winning each prize available, as they picked up only four bookings and no red cards over the 42 game period.

Ford's sponsorship of the competition is notable, with the 1970–71 season marking a watershed for sponsorship in English football. In addition to the Ford Sporting League, the season saw the first Watney Cup and first Texaco Cup, although The Football League itself turned down an offer of £600,000 to sponsor the Football League Cup.

Star players 
Frank McLintock was credited for his key role in Arsenal's double triumph with the FWA Footballer of the Year award.

Star managers 
Bertie Mee firmly re-established Arsenal as one of England's top clubs by guiding them to the double.
Dave Sexton guided Chelsea to Cup Winners' Cup glory over Real Madrid to bring the Londoners their first ever European trophy.
Bill Nicholson added a League Cup triumph to his long list of honours at Tottenham.

Events of the season 
 8 August 1970 – The Football League season begins.
 31 August 1970: The first month of the First Division campaign ends with Leeds United, champions two seasons ago, top of the league, having won their first five matches. Manchester City are second, with Liverpool, Derby County, Nottingham Forest and Chelsea just behind them and level on points. Wolverhampton Wanderers, Burnley and Ipswich Town are level on points at the bottom of the division.
 26 September 1970: Arsenal slip to fourth place in the First Division after they are thrashed 5–0 by Stoke City.
 30 September 1970: September ends with Leeds United still top of the First Division, two points ahead of their nearest rivals Manchester City. The challenge at the top remains a close one, with Tottenham Hotspur, Arsenal and Chelsea all level on points. Burnley are bottom of the table with no wins from their opening ten games.
 31 October 1970: Leeds United remain top of the First Division as October draws to a close, with Arsenal – two points behind them – now their closest challengers, as Manchester City have slipped to fourth place and the third place is now occupied by Tottenham Hotspur. Crystal Palace, in only their second season in the top flight, are sixth in the league and emerging as surprise outsiders for a possible title challenge. Blackpool and Burnley continue to prop up the rest of the First Division.
 30 November 1970: November ends with Leeds United still First Division leaders. They now have a four-point lead over Arsenal. Blackpool and Burnley continue their barren run and are still occupying the relegation places.
 26 December 1970: A thrilling league game at the Baseball Ground sees Derby County and Manchester United fight out a thrilling 4–4 draw. Derby occupy 17th place in the First Division in their second season since promotion, while United stand 18th just over two years after European Cup glory and just over three years since their last league title win. Blackpool and Burnley's dismal form has yet to improve and they still occupy the two relegation places. At the top end of the table, Leeds United remain top, three points ahead of Arsenal.
 29 December 1970: Wilf McGuinness is sacked after 18 months as manager of Manchester United. Legendary former manager and current director Sir Matt Busby is placed in charge of the first team until the end of the season.
 2 January 1971: Ten ties fall victim to the cold weather on FA Cup third round day. On the upset front, York City of the Fourth Division topple second-tier Bolton Wanderers while West Bromwich Albion of the top flight fail to beat Division Four club Scunthorpe United at home. In an all-Welsh clash, Swansea City beat Rhyl 6–1, and Jimmy Husband marks his return to the Everton ranks after an injury-enforced absence with a brace in his club's 2–0 win against Blackburn Rovers. In the capital, Crystal Palace and Chelsea draw while Wolverhampton Wanderers' four goals in the second half help them defeat Norwich City 5–1.
 31 January 1971: Leeds United now have a five-point lead over Arsenal, who have a game in hand, at the top of the First Division. The challenge from Tottenham Hotspur, Chelsea and Wolverhampton Wanderers is becoming increasingly distant, while Manchester City's title hopes are fading even quicker as they now occupy seventh place. Last season's champions Everton stand 13th, level on points with Manchester United, with Blackpool and Burnley still unable to form a good run and climb out of the relegation zone.
 27 February 1971: Tottenham Hotspur beat Aston Villa 2–0 in the Football League Cup final. In the league, Leeds United now have a seven-point lead over Arsenal, although the North Londoners have two games in hand. Manchester City have fallen away to eighth place, while Manchester United are enjoying something of a resurgence under the temporary leadership of Sir Matt Busby and have climbed from 18th place to 11th in the last two months. However, Burnley and Blackpool both remain in the relegation zone as their dismal form has continued.
 31 March 1971: With the league season now in its final quarter, Leeds United are six points ahead of Arsenal at the top of the First Division table, but Arsenal have three games in hand. At the bottom end of the table, Burnley and Blackpool's dismal season continues to show no sign of improvement as they still occupy the drop zone.
 17 April 1971: Arsenal overhaul Leeds United at the top of the First Division as they beat Newcastle United 1–0 and Leeds are controversially beaten 2–1 at home by struggling West Bromwich Albion. Arsenal and Leeds are now level on points, but the Gunners have a superior goal average and two games in hand.
 24 April 1971: Arsenal are held to a 2–2 draw by West Bromwich Albion, but are a point ahead of Leeds United, with the Gunners having three games remaining and the Yorkshire side only two. Burnley have their relegation confirmed when they lose 2–1 at home to Derby County. They join Blackpool in the Second Division next season.
 26 April 1971: Leeds United keep their slender title hopes alive by beating Arsenal 1–0 at Elland Road. Arsenal need to win their last two fixtures to be sure of the title.
 3 May 1971: A Ray Kennedy goal gives Arsenal a 1–0 away win over North London rivals Tottenham Hotspur at White Hart Lane and confirms them as First Division champions.
 8 May 1971: Arsenal become only the second club this century – and the fourth in history – to complete the double of the league title and FA Cup with a 2–1 win over Liverpool in the Wembley final in extra time, with substitute Eddie Kelly (the first to score in an FA Cup final) scoring their first goal and young forward Charlie George scoring a late winner.
 10 May 1971: Liverpool sign 20-year-old striker Kevin Keegan from Scunthorpe United for £33,000.
 19 May 1971: Chelsea draw 1–1 with Real Madrid of Spain in the European Cup Winners' Cup final in Athens.
 21 May 1971: Chelsea win the European Cup Winners' Cup final replay 2–1 with goals from John Dempsey and Peter Osgood.
 28 May 1971: Leeds United draw 2–2 with Juventus in Turin as they contest the first leg of the Inter-Cities Fairs Cup final. The original match had been abandoned two days before, due to heavy rain.
 3 June 1971: Leeds United lift the Inter-Cities Fairs Cup on away goals after drawing the second leg of the final 1–1 at Elland Road.
 8 June 1971: Manchester United appoint Leicester City's Frank O'Farrell as their new manager.

References

 
English Football, 1970-71 In
English Football, 1970-71 In